"Entre Mi Vida y la Tuya" ("Between My Life and Your Life") is a song by Colombia singer Fonseca. Is the lead single for the Fonseca's upcoming fifth studio album.

Charts

References

Fonseca (singer) songs
2015 singles
Spanish-language songs
2015 songs